Ungdomsøen (The Youth Island) is a youth camp located on the artificial island of Middelgrundsfortet in the Øresund sound between Copenhagen and Malmö.

Youth Camp
The camp can accommodate over 650 outdoor sleeping guests. It was officially opened in August 2019 by its patron Princess Benedikte.  10,000 people had visited the camp.

History
The island became available for sale in 2010 at a price of 75 million Danish kroner. Two scout organisations, Det Danske Spejderkorps and KFUM-spejderne, bought the island in April 2015 for 20 million kroner (£1.94M) with money donated by the A. P. Møller and Nordea funds. The two Danish scout organisations intend to develop the facility, at a cost of 25 Million euros, as an adventure playground "for the development of children and young people " (not just scouts) "into active, engaged and curious people who take the lead for positive social change", with space for 400 campers.

A youth summit entitled "Young Europe Cares" was hosted by youth activist group "Young Europe Is Voting"/Youth4Europe at the Ungdomsøen in May 2019.

Previous usage

Christian IX's government constructed the fort between 1890 and 1894. The fortress remained an active military installation until 1984; in 2002 it was sold to a private investor.

The fort had been used as a hotel, with 200 rooms linked by 2 miles of corridors.

References

External links
 
 
 Danish language wikipedia article

Scout campsites
Scouting and Guiding in Denmark
2019 establishments in Denmark
Outdoor structures in Denmark